The 2015–16 South Florida Bulls men's basketball team represented the University of South Florida during the 2015–16 NCAA Division I men's basketball season. The season marked the 45th basketball season for USF and the third as a member of the American Athletic Conference. The Bulls were coached by Orlando Antigua, who was in his second season. The Bulls played their home games at the USF Sun Dome on the university's Tampa, Florida campus. The Bulls finished the season with a record of 8–25, 4–14 in AAC play to finish in a tie for ninth place in conference. They beat East Carolina in the first round of the AAC tournament before losing to Temple in the quarterfinals.

Previous season 
The Bulls finished the 2014–15 season with a record of 9–23, 3–15 in AAC play to finish in last place in conference. They lost in the first round of the AAC tournament to UConn.

Departures

Incoming Transfers

Incoming recruits

Recruiting Class of 2016

Roster

Schedule and results

|-
!colspan=9 style="background:#006747; color:white;"| Exhibition

|-
!colspan=9 style="background:#006747; color:white;"| Non-conference regular season

|-
!colspan=9 style="background:#006747; color:white;"| Conference regular season

|-
!colspan=9 style="background:#006747; color:white;"| American Athletic Conference tournament

References

South Florida Bulls men's basketball seasons
South Florida Bulls
South Florida Bulls men's b
South Florida Bulls men's b